Laimutis Ločeris  (11 April 1929-13 November 2018) was a Lithuanian monumentalist painter and graphic artist. 

In 1952 he graduated from the Lithuanian Institute of Fine Arts and in 1958 from the Leningrad Academy of Fine Arts.

In 1987-1990 lived in Canada, where he worked different jobs not related to his profession. From 1990 to 2006 he taught painting at the Academy of Fine Arts in Vilnius.

Since 1960 he participated in exhibitions and created monumental works of decorative interiors, such as "Age Vilnius (Hotel Neringa, 1959)," Hunt Cup (cafe "Bull" in 1961, both in Vilnius), Dainava party (cafe Dainava Druskininkai, 1965), ornamental gates (world exhibition EXPO 70, Osaka etc.

In his artwork he regularly used materials such as metal, concrete, wood. He has also illustrated for several books and for the Canadian Lithuanian weekly "Homeland Lights" between 1987 and 2005 years.

See also
List of Lithuanian painters

References

 15min.lt: Frederic Chaubin on Laimutis Ločeris

Lithuanian painters
1929 births
2018 deaths
Lithuanian expatriates in Canada
Lithuanian graphic designers
People from Biržai
Vilnius Academy of Arts alumni